Stephen Frank Mandel Jr. (born March 12, 1956) is an American hedge fund manager,  investor, and philanthropist. He founded Lone Pine Capital in 1997, after working as the managing director at Tiger Management. According to Forbes, Mandel has an estimated net worth of US$3.9 billion as of August 2022.

Early life and education
Mandel is the son of Ann (née Safford) and Stephen Frank Mandel and grew up in Darien, Connecticut. He has a brother, Edward Safford Mandel. In 1974, Mandel graduated from the Phillips Exeter Academy. In 1978, he graduated from Dartmouth College with a Bachelor of Arts in government and was a member of the Psi Upsilon fraternity. He also has an M.B.A. from Harvard University.

Investment career
From 1982 to 1984, he worked at Mars & Co as a senior consultant and then from 1984 to 1990, he worked as a consumer-retail analyst at Goldman Sachs before working as a consumer analyst and eventually managing director at Tiger Management, a hedge fund founded by Julian Robertson. In 1997, he left Tiger and founded his own hedge fund, Lone Pine Capital LLC (named after a Dartmouth College pine tree that survived an 1887 lightning strike).

Forbes listed Stephen Mandel as one of the 40 Highest-Earning hedge fund managers in 2012, one of the top 25 in 2013, and one of the top 15 in 2018.

As of January 2019, Mandel will no longer manage investments for his Lone Pine Capital but will remain a managing director.

Wealth and philanthropy
According to Forbes Magazine, Mandel has a net worth of $3.9 billion as of October 2021. An increase of $1.1B, when compared to the Forbes 400 List, released October 2020

He was chairman of Dartmouth's board of trustees and is currently chair of the national board of directors at Teach for America.  He founded two charitable foundations: the Zoom Foundation and the Lone Pine Foundation. Mendel donated $1 million to the Lincoln Project, an anti-Donald Trump super PAC.

Personal life
In 1982, he married Susan Joy Zadek of Baltimore, whom he met at Harvard. They have three children. His wife is a trustee of the Environmental Defense Fund and of Vassar College.

References

External links
 "Big bucks for hedge fund workers," Money, July 5, 2005
 "The Power 30: The Investors," SmartMoney, October 10, 2006
 "The Forbes 400 #289 Stephen Mandel, Jr.," Forbes, October 4, 2021

Tiger Management
1956 births
Living people
20th-century American businesspeople
21st-century American businesspeople
21st-century philanthropists
American billionaires
American chairpersons of corporations
American chief executives of financial services companies
American financial analysts
American financial company founders
American hedge fund managers
American investors
American management consultants
Businesspeople from Greenwich, Connecticut
Dartmouth College alumni
Dartmouth College people
Goldman Sachs people
Harvard Business School alumni
Jewish American philanthropists
21st-century American Jews
Psi Upsilon